A labialized velar or labiovelar is a velar consonant that is labialized, with a -like secondary articulation. Such sounds occur across Africa and the Americas, in the Caucasus, etc.

Labialized velar approximants
The most common labiovelar consonant is the voiced approximant . It is normally a labialized velar, as is its vocalic cousin . (Labialization is called rounding in vowels, and a velar place is called back.)

 and its voiceless equivalent are the only labialized velars with dedicated IPA symbols:

 1 - In dialects that distinguish between which and witch.

The voiceless approximant is traditionally called a "voiceless labial–velar fricative", but true doubly articulated fricatives are not known to be used in any language, as they are quite difficult to pronounce and even more difficult to distinguish.

Historical development
In turn, they may sometimes develop into simple bilabial consonants. An example of this is the development of Proto-Indo-European *kʷ, *gʷ before *a or *o into Greek  /p, b/, producing cognates as different as English come and basis.

A notable development is the initial *kʷ in Proto-Indo-European interrogative words. In English, it developed into wh or h (how), pronounced /w/ in most dialects and /h/, respectively, via Grimm's law followed by wh-cluster reductions. By contrast, in Latin and its descendants, the Romance languages, that developed into qu (later Spanish cu (cuando) and c (como)), pronounced variously as /kw/ or /k/. See etymology of English interrogative words for details. The English phonemic spelling kw for qu (as in kwik) echoes its origin.

See also
Co-articulated consonant  
Doubly articulated consonant  
Voiced bilabial fricative  
Voiceless bilabial fricative

Phonology
Labialized consonants
Velar consonants